Jiang Ying (August 11, 1919 – February 5, 2012) was a Chinese opera singer and music teacher. She was the wife of Chinese rocket scientist Qian Xuesen, to whom she was married from 1947 until 2009 (his death).

Early life
On 11 Aug 1919, Jiang was born in Haining, Jiaxing, Zhejiang province. Jiang was of mixed Chinese and Japanese descent. She was the third daughter of Jiang Baili, a leading military strategist of Chiang Kai-shek, and his Japanese wife, . She was a distant relative of the wuxia novelist Louis Cha.

Education
In 1936 Jiang went to Europe with her father and studied music in Berlin. Jiang graduated from Universität der Künste Berlin in 1941. When World War II broke out in Europe, Jiang had to move and further studied opera in Switzerland. Jiang graduated from Musikhochschule Luzern in 1944.

Career
Jiang went back to China (at that time the Republic of China). On 31 May 1947, as a Chinese opera singer, Jiang first performed in Shanghai.

In 1947, Jiang moved to the United States. In 1955, when her husband Qian was deported by the United States government, Jiang went to the People's Republic of China together with him. Qian and Jiang entered China through Kowloon, Hong Kong.

Jiang became a professor of music and opera, and head of the department of Western Vocal Music at the Central Conservatory of Music in Beijing.

Personal
In 1947 in Shanghai, Jiang married Qian Xuesen. He was a rocket scientist and engineer who co-founded the Jet Propulsion Laboratory at the California Institute of Technology and later led the space program of the People's Republic of China.

Jiang died on 5 February 2012 in Beijing, China.

References

External links
 Memory of Jiang Yin and Tsien Hsue-sen (from Sohu)
 Famous singer and professor: Jiang Yin  (from www.gmw.cn)

1919 births
2012 deaths
20th-century Chinese women opera singers
Chinese people of Japanese descent
Musicians from Jiaxing
Singers from Zhejiang
Tsien family
Educators from Jiaxing